Sir Lyonel Lyde, 1st Baronet (1724–91), also known as Lionel Lyde, was a tobacco merchant.

Lyde was born in Bristol, where his father served as mayor. The Lyde family had interests in the tobacco plantations of Virginia and in slave trading.
Historic England describes Lyde as a tobacco merchant and a director of the Bank of England, but also indicates that the Lyde fortune came from the slave trade.
Lyonel and his brother Samuel formed a partnership dealing with the family's business affairs in London. Lyonel was made a director of the Bank of England in the 1760s. The American war of Independence subsequently created difficult conditions for the tobacco trade.

Homes
Lyonel acquired a country estate at Ayot St Lawrence, which had belonged to his uncle and father-in-law Cornelius Lyde. He partially demolished the existing church there, and built a neo-classical church, St Lawrence's, with twin mausolea for himself and his wife Rachel.

Lyde and his brother also leased houses in Bedford Square, a fashionable new development in London.

Baronetcy and legacy
A baronetcy was created for him in 1772. The baronetcy became extinct upon his death in 1791. The Ayot House estate passed to relatives, some of whom changed their name to Lyde. For example, Lionel Ames, who inherited the estate in 1806, assumed the surname and arms of Lyde.

References

1724 births
1791 deaths
Baronets in the Baronetage of Great Britain
Burials at Ayot St Lawrence
People from Ayot St Lawrence
Tobacco in the United Kingdom
British merchants